Geometry Wars is a series of top-down multi-directional shooter video games  developed by Bizarre Creations, and, later, Lucid Games. Originally published by Microsoft Games Studios, the first title was included as a minigame in Project Gotham Racing 2 for Xbox. An updated version was released in 2005 as a launch title for Xbox 360 and later ported to Microsoft Windows.

Other titles in the series was launched in follow years to other platforms by Bizarre Creations and publishers Vivendi Games and Activision. The latest entry in the series, Geometry Wars 3: Dimensions, was developed by Lucid Games and launched in 2014.

Games

Geometry Wars 

Geometry Wars was released in the form of an easter egg minigame in the 2003 racing game Project Gotham Racing 2 on the original Xbox. The game was accessed from within Project Gotham Racing 2 by interacting with an arcade cabinet present in the player's virtual garage.

Geometry Wars: Retro Evolved 

Geometry Wars: Retro Evolved was developed by Bizarre Creations and released for Xbox Live Arcade on Xbox 360. At one point, it held the record for the most downloaded Xbox Live Arcade Game.

Geometry Wars: Waves 
Geometry Wars: Waves was developed by Stephen Cakebread of Bizarre Creations, released as a bonus mini-game as part of Project Gotham Racing 4 on Xbox 360 on October 2, 2007. The game is a variant of Geometry Wars: Retro Evolved where the player is given one life to survive continual waves of orange rockets that pace back and forth across the edges of the play-field for as long as possible.

Geometry Wars: Galaxies 

Geometry Wars: Galaxies was developed by Bizarre Creations and Kuju Entertainment, and published by Vivendi Games for the Wii and Nintendo DS in November 2007, becoming the first Geometry Wars game available on non-Microsoft platforms and the only one available on Nintendo platforms.  This updated version includes a single-player campaign mode, several multiplayer modes, Geometry Wars: Retro Evolved, and support for online leaderboards. The Wii version supports widescreen and 480p progressive scan display.

Geometry Wars: Retro Evolved 2 

Geometry Wars: Retro Evolved 2 was developed by Bizarre Creations, and released on Xbox Live Arcade on Xbox 360 on July 30, 2008 as a sequel to Geometry Wars: Retro Evolved.

Geometry Wars: Touch 
An iOS port of Geometry Wars: Retro Evolved 2 was released in 2010 entitled Geometry Wars: Touch. It added a seventh game mode, Titans, which had gameplay similar to Asteroids, but removed the multiplayer functionality entirely.

Geometry Wars 3: Dimensions 

Geometry Wars 3: Dimensions was developed by Lucid Games and published by Activision under the Sierra Entertainment brand name. The game was released on November 25, 2014 for Microsoft Windows, OS X, Linux, PlayStation 3 and PlayStation 4, on November 26, 2014 for Xbox 360 and Xbox One and in the middle of 2015 for iOS, Android and PlayStation Vita. Geometry Wars 3: Dimensions is the first Sierra video game not to be owned by their former owner Vivendi. It is the first installment of Geometry Wars to be released on Sony platforms and developed after the creator of the series Bizarre Creations was shut down by Activision.

Soundtrack 
The soundtrack for the series was composed by Chris Chudley from Audioantics.

References 

 
Activision Blizzard franchises
Video game franchises introduced in 2003